Rupanjana Mitra is a Bengali film and television actress.

Biography 
Mitra has been working in Bengali film and television since 2000. Mitra made her debut in the television serial Chokher Bali and later worked on the television serial Chokher Bali.

Political career 
She is in Bharatiya Janta Party since 2019.

Works

Films 
 Ikir Mikir (2022)
 Panther (2019)
 Katakuti (2011)
 Teen Tanaya (2011)
 Magno Mainak (2009)
 Premer Phande Kakatua (2009)
 Jingle Bell (2018)(unreleased)
 Dadar Adesh (2005)

Television 
 Khela (character Manjari)(Zee Bangla)
 Ek Akasher Niche (character Mohini) (Zee Bangla)
 Tumi Asbe Bole
 Checkmate
 Sindoorkhela (Star Jalsha, character Debi) (later Replaced by Chandrayee Ghosh)
 Aanchol (Star Jalsha, character Gita)
 Soti (Zee Bangla, character Mohini)
 Janmabhumi (character Tamalika)
 Tithi Athiti (character Niki Bose)
 Behula (character Shanoka)
 Durga (character Neela)
 Premer Kahini (character Bijaylakshmi)
 Jai Kanhaiya Lal Ki as Sandhya

Web series 

 Bou Keno Psycho (21 February 2019)
 Dhanbad Blues (15 December 2018)
 Shey je holud pakhi (2021)

See also 
 Bidipta Chakraborty
 Churni Ganguly

References

External links 
 

Living people
Bengali television actresses
Actresses in Bengali cinema
Indian film actresses
Indian television actresses
21st-century Indian actresses
Year of birth missing (living people)